Union Sportive Alençonnaise 61 is a French association football club founded in 1916. They are based in the town of Alençon and their home stadium is the Stade Jacques Fould, which has a capacity of 1,500 spectators. As of the 2018–19 season, they play in the Championnat National 3.

Current squad

References

External links
US Alençon official website 

Alencon
Alencon
1916 establishments in France
Football clubs in Normandy
Sport in Orne